In accounting, current liabilities are often understood as all liabilities of the business that are to be settled in cash within the fiscal year or the operating cycle of a given firm, whichever period is longer.

A more complete definition is that current liabilities are obligations that will be settled by current assets or by the creation of new current liabilities.  Accounts payable are due within 30 days, and are paid within 30 days, but do often run past 30 days or 60 days in some situations.  The laws regarding late payment and claims for unpaid accounts payable is related to the issue of accounts payable. An operating cycle for a firm is the average time that is required to go from cash to cash in producing revenues. For example, accounts payable for goods, services or supplies that were purchased for use in the operation of the business and payable within a normal period would be current liabilities.  Amounts listed on a balance sheet as accounts payable represent all
bills payable to vendors of a company, whether or not the bills are less than 31 days old or more than 30 days old. Therefore, late payments are not disclosed on the balance sheet for accounts payable.  There may be footnotes in audited financial statements regarding age of accounts payable, but this is not common accounting practice.  Lawsuits regarding accounts payable are required to be shown on audited financial statements, but this is not necessarily common accounting practice.

Bonds, mortgages and loans that are payable over a term exceeding one year would be fixed liabilities or long-term liabilities.  However, the payments due on the long-term loans in the current fiscal year could be considered current liabilities if the amounts were material. Amounts due to lenders/ bankers are never shown as accounts payable/ trade accounts payable, but will show up on the balance sheet of a company under the major heading of current liabilities, and often under the sub-heading of other current liabilities, instead of accounts payable, which are due to vendors.  Other current liabilities are due for payment according to the terms of the loan agreements, but when lender liabilities are shown as current vs. long term, they are due within the current fiscal year or earlier. Therefore, late payments from a previous fiscal year will carry over into the same position on the balance sheet as current liabilities which are not late in payment.  There may be footnotes in audited financial statements regarding past due payments to lenders, but this is not common practice.  Lawsuits regarding loans payable are required to be shown on audited financial statements, but this is not necessarily common accounting practice.

The proper classification of liabilities provides useful information to investors and other users of the financial statements.  It may be regarded as essential for allowing outsiders to consider a true picture of an organization's fiscal health.

One application is in the current ratio, defined as the firm's current assets divided by its current liabilities.  A ratio higher than one means that current assets, if they can all be converted to cash, are more than sufficient to pay off current obligations.  All other things equal, higher values of this ratio imply that a firm is more easily able to meet its obligations in the coming year. The difference between current assets and current liability is referred to as trade working capital.

Liability (financial accounting)